The 1994 Ohio gubernatorial election took place on November 8, 1994. Incumbent Republican Governor of Ohio George Voinovich ran for re-election to a second and final term as governor. Voinovich won his party's nomination uncontested and was opposed by State Senator Rob Burch, who won a competitive Democratic primary. Ultimately, Voinovich capitalized on his massive popularity with Ohio and won re-election in an overwhelming landslide, defeating Burch and winning over 70% of the vote. , this was the last time Athens County voted for the Republican candidate.

Democratic primary

Candidates
Rob Burch, Ohio State Senator
Peter Michael Schuller, philosophy professor and former congressional candidate

Results

Republican primary

Candidates
George Voinovich, incumbent Governor of Ohio

Results

General election

Results

References

Gubernatorial
1994
Ohio